Armani Lee Rogers (born December 4, 1997) is an American football tight end for the Washington Commanders of the National Football League (NFL). He was a college football quarterback at UNLV and Ohio and holds the record for longest run by a NCAA quarterback at 99 yards, doing so with the latter in 2021. Rogers signed with the Commanders as an undrafted free agent in 2022.

Early years
The son of former NFL linebacker Sam Rogers, Armani was born on December 4, 1997, in Buffalo, New York. He grew up in Los Angeles and attended Alexander Hamilton High School, where he passed for 1,433 yards and 18 touchdowns while rushing for 431 yards and six touchdowns as a senior. Rogers was rated a three-star recruit and initially committed to play college football at California over offers from UCLA, Washington, and Utah. He decommitted during his senior year following changes to California's coaching staff and later signed to play at UNLV after considering Fresno State.

College career

UNLV Rebels
Rogers began his college career at the University of Nevada, Las Vegas and redshirted as a freshman. He started nine games for the Rebels during his redshirt freshman season and was named the Mountain West Conference Freshman of the Year after completing 99 of 189 pass attempts for 1,471 yards and six touchdowns with five interceptions and setting a school record for rushing yards by a quarterback with 780 and also rushing for eight touchdowns. Rogers suffered a foot injury in the fourth game of his redshirt sophomore year and missed the next six games before returning and finishing the season with 601 passing yards and 10 touchdowns and 565 rushing yards and eight touchdowns. He passed for 393 yards with two touchdowns and three interceptions and rushed 204 yards and two touchdowns in four games as a redshirt junior before again suffering an injury.

Ohio Bobcats
Rogers transferred to Ohio as a graduate student. In 2020, he was used mostly in offensive package plays and threw for 48 yards and a touchdown while rushing for 114 yards and two touchdowns. Rogers used the extra year of eligibility granted to college athletes in 2020 due to the COVID-19 pandemic and returned to Ohio for a second season. He started two games at quarterback and was also used in offensive packages throughout the season, finishing the season with 334 passing yards and 552 rushing yards and seven touchdowns, including a 99-yard rushing touchdown against the Buffalo Bulls, which set an NCAA record for a quarterback.

Professional career
Rogers transitioned to tight end prior to playing in the 2022 East–West Shrine Bowl. He signed with the Washington Commanders as an undrafted free agent on May 2, 2022. On November 19, the Commanders placed Rogers on injured reserve. On January 7, 2023, he was activated from injured reserve.

References

External links
 Washington Commanders bio
Ohio Bobcats bio
UNLV Rebels bio

1997 births
Living people
American football quarterbacks
American football tight ends
UNLV Rebels football players
Players of American football from Los Angeles
Ohio Bobcats football players
Washington Commanders players
African-American players of American football